Braunschweigisches Landesmuseum (BLM) is a history museum in Braunschweig, Germany, operated by the state of Lower Saxony. The museum is scattered on four locations: Vieweghaus, Hinter Ägidien (both in Braunschweig), Kanzlei (Wolfenbüttel) and Bauernhausmuseum (Bortfeld).

The collection covers 500,000 years and includes objects from the history of the Braunschweig area, including culture, economy, technology, folk arts, and social history. Today, the BLM hosts a collection of 600,000 to 800,000 objects.

History
The museum's history dates back to 11 October 1891, when it was founded in the Duchy of Brunswick as Vaterländisches Museum für Braunschweigische Landesgeschichte. Originally it was located in a street called Hagenscharrn in the city of Braunschweig. In 1938, the museum was renamed to Braunschweigisches Landesmuseum für Geschichte und Volkstum. This name remained until 31 December 1982.

Vieweghaus
The neoclassicist building, the former publishing house of Vieweg Verlag, hosts the main collection, and is located in the city center at the castle square (Burgplatz). A large part of the collection was moved there in 1986.

Hinter Ägidien
Located in the street Hinter St. Aegidien, this annex exhibits Judaica and was opened to the public in 1746. Center piece is a synagogue interior from Hornburg.

Kanzlei Wolfenbüttel
This annex focuses on prehistoric and ancient history (500,000 BC until 8th century AD) of the region and was established there in 1959. The building was built in the 16th century and is located in the city center.

Bauernhausmuseum
The Bortfelder Bauernhausmuseum section was opened in 1968 and is located in Bortfeld, a village in the municipality of Wendeburg, district of Peine. This museum reflects on the rural life of the region. The central attraction is a farmhouse from 1639 (reetgedecktes Hallenhaus).

Gallery

See also 
 List of museums in Germany

Literature 
 Gerd Biegel (Hrsg.): Herzöge, Revolution und Nierentisch. 1200 Jahre Braunschweigische Landesgeschichte, Veröffentlichungen des Braunschweigischen Landesmuseums 67, Braunschweig 1992
 Camerer, Garzmann, Schuegraf, Pingel: Braunschweiger Stadtlexikon, Braunschweig 1992
 Horst-Rüdiger Jarck, Gerhard Schildt (Hrsg.): Braunschweigische Landesgeschichte. Jahrtausendrückblick einer Region, Braunschweig 2000

References

External links 

 

Landesmuseum
Museums in Lower Saxony
History museums in Germany
Religious museums in Germany
Folk museums in Germany
Jewish art
1891 establishments in Germany
19th-century establishments in the Duchy of Brunswick
Museums established in 1891
History of Brunswick
Organisations based in Braunschweig